The Chipping Norton Stakes is an Australian Turf Club Group 1 Thoroughbred horse race for horses three years old and older, run at weight for age, over a distance of 1600 metres at Randwick Racecourse, Sydney, Australia in February or March. Prizemoney is A$600,000.

History
The race is major preparatory race for the Group 1 Doncaster Handicap and Sydney Cup as the winner is exempt from ballot for entry into each race.

The race is named after the suburb Chipping Norton located in Liverpool located 27 kilometres south-west of Sydney. The race is usually held together with the Liverpool City Cup as part of the City of Liverpool festivities.

Some outstanding champions have won this race including Phar Lap, Tranquil Star, Bernborough and Tulloch and Super Impose.

Tie the Knot won the race four consecutive times, a feat matched by Winx in March 2019.

1949 racebook

Distance
 1925–1972 -  miles (~2000 metres)
 1972–1979 – 2100 metres
 1980 onwards - 1600 metres

Grade
 1925–1979 - Principal race
 1980–1985 - Group 2
 1986 onwards - Group 1 race

Venue
 From 1939 due to World War II and after until 1952 the event was held at Randwick Racecourse.

 1979–1991 - Warwick Farm Racecourse
 1992 - Randwick Racecourse
 1993–2000 - Warwick Farm Racecourse
 2001 - Randwick Racecourse
 2002–2007 - Warwick Farm Racecourse
 2008–2009 - Randwick Racecourse
 2010–2015 - Warwick Farm Racecourse
 2016 onwards - Randwick Racecourse

Gallery of noted winners

Winners

 2023 - Anamoe
 2022 - Verry Elleegant
 2021 - Verry Elleegant
 2020 - Te Akau Shark
 2019 - Winx
 2018 - Winx
 2017 - Winx
 2016 - Winx 
 2015 - Contributor 
 2014 - Boban
 2013 - Shoot Out
 2012 - Shoot Out
 2011 - Danleigh
 2010 - Theseo
 2009 - Tuesday Joy
 2008 - Casino Prince
 2007 - He's No Pie Eater
 2006 - Desert War
 2005 - Grand Armee
 2004 - Starcraft
 2003 - Lonhro
 2002 - Tie the Knot
 2001 - Tie the Knot
 2000 - Tie the Knot
 1999 - Tie the Knot
 1998 - Encounter
 1997 -Octagonal
 1996 - Juggler
 1995 - Pharaoh
 1994 - Telesto
 1993 - Kingston Bay
 1992 - Super Impose
 1991 - Super Impose
 1990 - Dr. Grace
 1989 - Flotilla
 1988 - Wong
 1987 - Our Waverley Star
 1986 - Heat Of The Moment
 1985 - Rising Prince
 1984 - Emancipation
 1983 - Dalmacia
 1982 - Vivacite 
 1981 - Prince Ruling    
 1980 - Embasadora 
 1979 - Leonotis 
 1978 - Grey Affair 
 1977 - In Pursuit 
 1976 - Taras Bulba 
 1975 - Apollo Eleven 
 1974 - Igloo 
 1973 - Apollo Eleven 
 1972 - Latin Knight 
 1971 - Gay Icarus 
 1970 - Great Exploits
 1969 - Rain Lover
 1968 - General Command 
 1967 - Striking Force 
 1966 - Prince Grant 
 1965 - Bon Filou 
 1964 - Maidenhead 
 1963 - The Dip 
 1962 - Sky High 
 1961 - Valerius 
 1960 - Tulloch
 1959 - Caesar 
 1958 - Tulloch
 1957 - Mac's Amber 
 1956 - Somerset Fair 
 1955 - Carioca 
 1954 - Gallant Archer 
 1953 - Carioca   
 1952 - Delta
 1951 - Comic Court 
 1950 - Carbon Copy 
 1949 - Carbon Copy 
 1948 - Fresh Boy 
 1947 - Vigaro 
 1946 - Bernborough
 1945 - Katanga
 1944 - Katanga
 1943 - Veiled Threat 
 1942 - race not held
 1941 - Tranquil Star
 1940 - Reading 
 1939 - Defaulter 
 1938 - John Wilkes 
 1937 - Lough Neagh 
 1936 - Lough Neagh 
 1935 - Rogilla 
 1934 - Silver Scorn 
 1933 - Lough Neagh
 1932 - Ammon Ra 
 1931 - Chide 
 1930 - Phar Lap
 1929 - Strephon 
 1928 - Limerick 
 1927 - Amounis 
 1926 - Windbag
 1925 - Wallace Mortlake

See also
 List of Australian Group races
 Group races

External links 
First three placegetters Chipping Norton Stakes (ATC)
Everything you need to know about Chipping Norton Stakes

References

Group 1 stakes races in Australia
Open mile category horse races